Dame Julie Bethridge Topp  (born 14 May 1958), known as Jools Topp, is one half of the Topp Twins, a music comedy duo from New Zealand; the other member is her twin sister Lynda Topp. Jools Topp has been singing and entertaining with her sister for decades, touring live music and comedy performances as well as performing in TV and film. The sisters were both appointed Dames Companion of the New Zealand Order of Merit in the 2018 Queen's Birthday Honours.

Background and personal life 
Jools Topp and her twin sister Lynda were born on 14 May in 1958 in Huntly, to Jean and Peter, and grew up on a dairy farm in Waikato. Topp also has an older brother called Bruce. Topp attended Ruawaro Combined School during the 1960s and early 1970s. The twins have been singing together since they were five years old and their brother gave them a guitar when they were 11.

After leaving school in 1976, Jools and Lynda Topp joined the New Zealand Territorial Force and were posted at the Burnham Military Camp near Christchurch for six weeks. When they were 17, they performed at the Victorian Coffee Lounge (Montreal Street, Christchurch Central City). This brought them into contact with radical lesbian feminists. They both started identifying as lesbian from the late 1970s. Much of their life has been in the public eye and their mother was interviewed by Radio New Zealand about the closure of the New Zealand Woman's Weekly magazine in 2020 talking about how much her daughters had been featured in these magazines.

On the birth of a new generation with Lynda being a grandparent and Jools being a grand aunt they admitted they didn't expect it when they were younger because as they said: "We're all gay", referring also to their brother.

Horses 

Jools Topp is a skilled horsewoman and for many years had a  property in Helensville, north of Auckland, with her partner. They had dogs, chickens, cattle, cats and about ten horses with an equestrian area. Called Liberty Circle Ranch, Topp's property helped families to rehabilitate and train horses through the business NZ Horse Help run by Teresa Trull and Michaela Evans. It was said Topp "answers her phone while riding her horses bareback in her arena". The property was sold when the couple split up after 17 years together.

Breast cancer 
Jools Topp was diagnosed with breast cancer in October 2006 at the age of 48. Originally examined by a physician in January 2006, nothing was done as it was not detected by a mammogram. Topp was diagnosed seven months later when the breast cancer showed up with an ultrasound exam. She recovered well after receiving a mastectomy in October 2006 and several months of chemotherapy.

In March 2022 Jools and Lynda revealed that they had both been diagnosed with breast cancer in 2021.

Career 

Jools Topp along with her sister Lynda has had a long career in entertainment in New Zealand. They sing country and folk music with harmonies often to raise people's social consciousness. As entertainers, Lynda Topp leads the comedy and "works the audience", and mostly Jools plays the guitar and leads the song making. Lynda particularly focused on yodelling. The Topp Twins' popularity arose from a regular stint busking in Auckland when they were in their early 20s. They got taken to court for causing obstruction on Queen Street because their crowd was too big. They won the case and benefited from the publicity. Soon after that they travelled and performed to university crowds around New Zealand. They are well known for their costumed comedic characters such as Ken & Ken, and Camp Leader and Camp Mother. They have been a lot on television in character including in 2000 hosting a quiz show called Mr and Mrs, in which couples answered questions about how well they knew each other, and a 2014 to 2016 a cooking show called Topp Country.

Awards 
1987 Listener Film and Television Awards. Best Entertainer: Topp Twins
1987 Listener Film and Television Awards. Best Entertainment Programme: Topp Twins Special
1987 Listener Film and Television Awards. Best Original Music: Topp Twins Special
1997 TV Guide Television Awards. Best Performance in an Entertainment Programme (shared with Lynda Topp): for Topp Twins, Do Not Adjust Your Twinset, episode 2
2004 New Zealand Order of Merit. (Shared with Lynda Topp) For Services to Entertainment
2009 Melbourne International Film Festival. Audience Award for Documentary: The Topp Twins: Untouchable Girls
2009 Qantas Film and Television Awards. Best Feature Film – Under $1 Million: The Topp Twins: Untouchable Girls
2009 Qantas Film and Television Awards. Original Music (shared with Lynda Topp): for The Topp Twins: Untouchable Girls
2009 Toronto International Film Festival. Audience Award for Documentary: The Topp Twins: Untouchable Girls
2010 Brattleboro Film Festival (United States). Best of Festival Award: The Topp Twins: Untouchable Girls
2010 FIFO Oceanian International Documentary Film Festival (Tahiti). Special Jury Award: The Topp Twins: Untouchable Girls
2010 Gothenburg International Film Festival (Sweden). Audience Dragon Award for Best Feature Film: The Topp Twins: Untouchable Girls
2010 Portland International Film Festival. Best Feature Documentary: The Topp Twins: Untouchable Girls
2010 Qantas Film and Television Awards. Best Entertainment Programme: The Topp Twins and The APO
2017 New Zealand Television Awards. Best Presenter – Entertainment (shared with Lynda Topp): for Topp Country, season two
2018 Dame Companion of the New Zealand Order of Merit for services to entertainment
2019 Lifetime Achievement Award at the NEXT Woman of the Year Awards

Aotearoa Music Awards
The Aotearoa Music Awards (previously known as New Zealand Music Awards (NZMA)) are an annual awards night celebrating excellence in New Zealand music and have been presented annually since 1965.

! 
|-
| 2008 || Jools Topp (as part of Topp Twins) || New Zealand Music Hall of Fame ||  || 
|-

Screenography 
 Funny As: The Story of New Zealand Comedy 2019, Subject – Television
 Poi E: The Story of Our Song 2016, Subject – Film
 Topp Country 2014 – 2015, Presenter – Television
 The Topp Twins and the APO 2010, Presenter, Presenter – Television
 The Topp Twins: – Untouchable Girls, 2009, Subject – Film
 Ken's Hunting and Fishing Show, 2007, Actor – Television
 Ken's Hunting and Fishing Show – Tongariro, 2007, Musician, Actor – Television
 The Adventures of Roman Pilgrim, 2005, As: One of the Fates – Short Film
 Mr and Mrs, 2000, Presenter – Television
 In Search of the Lonesome Yodel, 2000, Presenter – Television
 The Topp Twins – Highland Games, 2000, Performer, Writer, Producer – Television
 The Topp Twins – Speedway, 1998, Producer, Performer, Writer – Television
 1998 Hero Parade, 1998, Subject – Television
 Destination Planet Earth, 1997 – 1998, Subject – Television
 The Topp Twins, 1996 – 2000, Writer, Producer, Performer – Television
 The Topp Twins – The Beach, 1996, Performer, Producer, Writer – Television
 The Topp Twins: Do Not Adjust Your Twinset, 1996, Presenter – Television
 Beyond a Joke! 1995, Subject – Television
 The People Next Door, 1994, Subject – Television
 Camping Out with the Topp Twins, 1993, Subject – Television
 Rivers of NZ, 1992, Subject – Television
 Topp Twins TV Special, 1986, Subject
 That's Country, 1983 – 1984, Performer – Television

Books 
 

She has also released five best-selling children’s audio books.

Discography 

The Topp Twins have released a number of vinyls, tapes, and CDs.

References

External links

Topp Twins TV show on NZ On Screen

You Tube Channel

1958 births
Living people
APRA Award winners
Lesbian musicians
Lesbian comedians
New Zealand LGBT musicians
Yodelers
People from Huntly, New Zealand
New Zealand women comedians
Dames Companion of the New Zealand Order of Merit
Twin musicians
New Zealand LGBT singers
Singers awarded knighthoods